Megafauna refers to living or extinct large or giant animals.

Megafauna  may also refer to:
Megafauna (band), an American rock band
Megafauna (mythology), giant animals in mythological contexts
Macrobenthos, naked-eye visible bottom-dwelling animals

See also
 Megafaun, an American psychedelic folk band